In geometry, the great rhombihexacron (or great dipteral disdodecahedron) is a nonconvex isohedral polyhedron. It is the dual of the uniform great rhombihexahedron (U21). It has 24 identical bow-tie-shaped faces, 18 vertices, and 48 edges.

It has 12 outer vertices which have the same vertex arrangement as the cuboctahedron, and 6 inner vertices with the vertex arrangement of an octahedron.

As a surface geometry, it can be seen as visually similar to a Catalan solid, the disdyakis dodecahedron, with much taller rhombus-based pyramids joined to each face of a rhombic dodecahedron.

Proportions

The dihedral angle equals .
The ratio between the lengths of the long edges and the short ones equals .

Notes

References

 uniform polyhedra and duals

Dual uniform polyhedra